CityWalk or City Walk may refer to:

 Universal CityWalk, entertainment and retail districts located adjacent to the theme parks of Universal Parks & Resorts, United States
 City Walk, Canberra, Australia
 City Walk, Dubai, United Arab Emirates
 Citywalk, Hong Kong, a shopping centre in Tsuen Wan, New Territories, Hong Kong
 Select Citywalk, a premier shopping mall located in the Saket District Centre, in Saket, New Delhi